The House of Gundulić (known in Italian as Gondola) was a noble family of the Republic of Ragusa, considered one of the most prestigious families of the republic. It had origins in southern Dalmatia and Tyrol. The family´s motto is Tout ou rien ("All or nothing").

Origin 
According to historian Serafin Cerva, the Gundulić patriciate dates to 930, as does those of Gozze, Pozza and Giorgi, meaning that they were deemed the oldest ones of Ragusa. The first known member of the Gundulić family was known as Silvanus. The mention of the name comes from 1024. The name Gundulić derives from Greek, xovbu (vase à boire), as said, or xouvrexac; (barque).

Middle Ages 
In the 13th century, three generations of this family took leading roles in the public life in Ragusa. In the 15th century, Paladino Gundulić held the important position of a diplomat of the Republic to the Kingdom of Naples and Skanderbeg.

17th century 
The poet Ivan Gundulić (1589-1638) became the most significant person in the Gundulić-Gondola family, being named the Count of Konavle in 1615 and 1619. In 1634 he became a senator. At the end of 1638 he was elected to the Small Council, but died before taking office. Ivan married Nicoletta Sorgo-Sorkočević, daughter of Sigmund Sorgo-Sorkočević.

Ivan's son, Frano, served the Austrian Empire and the Polish King Jan III Sobieski in 1683, participating in the defeat of the Ottoman Turks at the Battle of Vienna. The family then obtained fiefdoms from Emperor Leopold I. The others sons, Sigmund (Šiško) and Matteo, spent several years in the military service of the Spanish Habsburgs. After his return to Dubrovnik, Mateo lived in Turkey for 28 months, until 1674. Matteo later married a commoner, but had no children. He was elected the Rector of Ragusa many times.

On 20 April 1693 the Secretary of the Republic of Ragusa, Michael Allegrettus, confirmed the nobility of the family on behalf of the Rectors and the Great Council (Consilium Maius), its  patrician status.

Gallery

See also 
 Paladino Gondola (fl. 1423–72), diplomat and merchant
 Trojan Gundulić
 Ivan Gundulić
 Fran Đivo Gundulić
 Šišmundo Gundulić
 Dživo Šiškov Gundulić
 Frano Getaldić-Gundulić

Annotations

References

Sources

External links 
 House of Ghetaldi-Gondola
 Franz Joseph Count Gondola
  Storia famiglia Gundulig
 Grafen Familie Gondola p. 596-7

Ragusan noble families